Codiscos (which is short for Compañía Colombiana de Discos, meaning "Colombian Record Company") is a record label headquartered in Medellín, Colombia. It was founded in 1950 by Alfredo Díez Montoya with the name Zeida Ltd, which is today the name of its popular label dedicated to tropical music. Along with Discos Fuentes, it is one of the oldest and largest record labels of Colombia.

History
In 1958, it became an operational recording studio, with the aim of not only distributing, but also recording and encouraging the talents of Colombian authors, composers, arrangers and performers. Currently the company has three studios.

Codiscos was in licensing agreements with U.S. Sonotone Records and Balboa Records that have since been discontinued.

On 1 August 2005, it opened a branch, called "Codiscos Corp." in Miami, Florida.

Artists
Codiscos was the label of Juanes when he was part of the group Ekhymosis, when they signed their first record deal.

Codiscos has been the record label for the following artists, among others:

See also
 Polen Records

References

Colombian music
Colombian record labels
Record labels established in 1950